Amanda Kim Banton (born 26 July 1970) is an Australian lawyer who specialises in corporate litigation, particularly matters involving complex financial instruments and insolvency based disputes. Until March 2020 she was a partner in the Sydney office of global business law firm Squire Patton Boggs.  Banton is the currently the Managing Partner of Banton Group, a firm she established in 2020. Banton Group specializes in large commercial dispute resolution, class actions, restructuring and insolvency litigation and advisory matters.

Banton is best known for successfully representing a range of religious organisations, charities and local government authorities seeking redress for losses suffered after they purchased "toxic" financial products created and sold by various financial institutions, including Lehman Brothers and ABN Amro. She is also the first and only lawyer to successfully win judgement against a ratings agency (Standard & Poor's) for misrating such products as AAA.

Between October 2014 and March 2016 Banton filed a number of further class actions against Standard & Poor's alleging misleading and deceptive conduct and negligence by S&P.  Those claims were amended in October 2017 to allege deceit against S&P.  Those matters were settled in May 2018 for $215 million.  The Court approved the settlement in August 2018.

In 2014 Banton also filed a class action law suit against another ratings firm, Fitch Ratings, alleging that the firm "had engaged in misleading or deceptive conduct and was negligence in giving AAA and AA ratings to certain collateralized debt obligations known as Palladin AAA and Palladin AA." Fitch settled pre-trial in September 2019 for AU$27 million, representing the recovery of about 95% of the losses incurred by the plaintiffs, and is believed to be (in percentage terms), one of the largest settlements achieved pre-trial in Australia.

Amanda's practice encompasses a broad range of corporate and commercial litigation matters, with a particular emphasis on matters relating to the Corporations Act, insolvency, state and federal trade practices legislation, negligence and contractual disputes.

Amanda acted for the Dr and Mrs Dyczynski in a case which arose for the shooting down of MH17.  The Full Federal Court has upheld the appeal brought by Dr and Mrs Dyczynski, the parents who lost their daughter on board the MH17 Malaysian Airlines crash, against their exclusion from a class action settlement brought by LHD Lawyers on behalf of family members of victims of the crash.

In the Australasian Law Awards 2021, Banton was awarded an Excellence Award in the Law Firm Leader of the Year and Banton Group was awarded an Excellence Award in the Law Firm of the Year.

Biography 
Banton completed bachelor's degrees in Commerce and Law at the University of Adelaide in 2002. (B.Comm, LLB).

Banton commenced her legal career at Piper Alderman in 2002 where she practiced in corporate litigation and restructuring & insolvency. She was appointed Partner in 2007. In 2015 Banton and a team of 11 lawyers plus support staff left the firm and joined Squire Patton Boggs.

Banton is admitted to practice in the Supreme Court of New South Wales, the Supreme Court of Queensland and the High Court of Australia.

In 2000 Banton worked at KPMG Consulting (Later BearingPoint) in the Public Sector Consulting Group. She advised on a range of projects including process reengineering, change management and performance improvement and reporting.

Between approximately 1992 and 2000 she worked for the Commonwealth Government. Banton's roles included being a senior officer with responsibilities in respect of the education budget at the Department of Finance and senior roles at a statutory organisation engaged pursuant to the Commonwealth's purchaser provider framework. Banton's role at the statutory organisation included developing the performance framework and reporting processes for the provider contract.

Awards  
2021 Excellence Award in Australasia Law Awards - Law Firm Leader of the Year
2020 Elite Leading Lawyer in Dispute Resolution - Class Actions
2020 Lawyers Weekly - Partner of the Year Awards - Finalist - Dispute Resolution
2020 Ranked in Chambers - Asia Pacific 
2019 Elite Leading Lawyer in Dispute Resolution - Class Actions
2019 The Legal 500 Asia Pacific - Leading Individual - Dispute Resolutions: Class Actions - Squire Patton Boggs
2019 Australian Dispute Resolution Partner of the Year (finalist) – Lawyers Weekly
2018 Elite Leading Lawyer in Dispute Resolution - Class Actions
2018 The Legal 500 Asia Pacific - Leading Individual - Dispute Resolution - Squire Patton Boggs
2018 Australian Dispute Resolution Team of the Year (finalist) – Lawyers Weekly
2017 Elite Leading Lawyer in Dispute Resolution - Class Actions
2017 The Legal 500 Asia Pacific - Leading individual - Dispute Resolution - Squire Patton Boggs
2016 Australian Insolvency Partner of the Year (winner)– Lawyers Weekly
2014 Hot 40 Private Practice Lawyer - Australasian Lawyer
2013 Australian Dispute Star for Restructuring and Insolvency - Euromoney's Benchmark, Asia Pacific

References

External links 
 Banton Group website
 Amanda Banton LinkedIn Profile

1970 births
Living people
University of Adelaide alumni
Australian women lawyers
21st-century Australian lawyers
21st-century women lawyers
People associated with Squire Patton Boggs